Southern Indian Cinema is used to refer collectively to the four distinct film industries of  Kollywood (Tamil), 
Mollywood (Malayalam), Sandalwood (Kannada) and Tollywood (Telugu) as a single entity. The list is based on the conservative box office estimates as reported by industry sources. However, there is no official tracking of figures and sources publishing data are frequently pressured to increase their estimates.

Overview 
South Indian cinema has always produced their films cost effectively.  However, in recent times, it has produced many of the most expensive films in Indian cinema, such as 2.0, Enthiran, Baahubali and RRR .

The first South Indian film to gross ₹200crore worldwide was the 2008 Tamil film Dasavathaaram, in which one of India's most Prolific Actor Kamal Haasan essayed ten different roles. Also, the first South Indian film to gross over ₹100crore worldwide was the 2007 Tamil film Sivaji, which starred Rajinikanth and Shriya Saran in lead roles. The first South Indian film to gross over ₹600 crore worldwide was the 2015 film Baahubali: The Beginning. Also, the first South Indian film as well as the first Indian film to gross over ₹1000crore worldwide was the 2017 sequel film Baahubali 2: The Conclusion directed by S. S. Rajamouli. The highest-grossing film in India is Baahubali 2: The Conclusion (2017), with a total domestic gross of ₹1,429.83crore.

Highest-grossing films worldwide 
The South Indian films which grossed a minimum of 200 crore worldwide are listed here, which includes films from all South Indian languages. The figures are not adjusted for inflation.

List of highest-grossing films by language

Kannada

Malayalam

Tamil

Telugu

Highest-grossing films by year

Records

Biggest opening day

Biggest opening weekend

Highest-grossing franchises and film series

See also 
 List of highest-grossing Telugu films
 List of highest-grossing Tamil films
 List of highest-grossing Malayalam films
 List of highest-grossing Kannada films
 List of highest-grossing Indian films
 List of highest-grossing films in India
 1000 Crore Club
 100 Crore Club

Notes

References 

Lists of Indian films
Telugu cinema
Tamil cinema
Kannada cinema
Malayalam cinema
Tulu cinema
Cinema of India